James Gilespie Blaine McKusick (February 23, 1888 – August 8, 1960) was an American football and basketball coach. He served as both the head football coach and head basketball coach at the University of South Dakota from 1916 to 1917.

McKusick attended Bowdoin College in Maine before becoming a student at the University of South Dakota School of Law in 1911. He also served as the head football coach at Missouri Military Academy in Mexico, Missouri in 1920.

Head coaching record

Football

References

External links
 

1888 births
1960 deaths
Basketball coaches from Maine
Bowdoin Polar Bears football players
South Dakota Coyotes football coaches
South Dakota Coyotes men's basketball coaches
High school football coaches in Missouri
University of South Dakota School of Law alumni
People from Calais, Maine
Coaches of American football from Maine
Players of American football from Maine